The 22141 / 22142 Pune - Nagpur Humsafar Express is a superfast train belonging to Central Railway zone that runs between Pune Junction and Nagpur Junction.

It is currently being operated with 22141/22142 train numbers on a weekly basis.

Coach Composition 

The trains is completely 3-tier AC sleeper trains designed by Indian Railways with features of LED screen display to show information about stations, train speed etc. and will have announcement system as well, Vending machines for tea, coffee and milk, Bio toilets in compartments as well as CCTV cameras.

Service

The 22141/Pune - Nagpur Humsafar Express has an average speed of 57 km/hr and covers 890 km in 15h 30m.

The 22142/Nagpur - Pune Humsafar Express has an average speed of 52 km/hr and covers 890 km in 17h 05m.

Route & Halts

Schedule

Traction

It is hauled by an Ajni based WAP 7 (HOG) equipped locomotive from end to end.

Rake Sharing

The train shares its rake with 22139/22140 Pune-Ajni Humsafar Express.

See also 

 Humsafar Express
 Pune Junction railway station
 Nagpur Junction railway station

Notes

References 

Humsafar Express trains
Rail transport in Maharashtra
Transport in Pune
Transport in Nagpur
Railway services introduced in 2019